Karczewski (feminine Karczewska) is a Polish surname. Notable people with the surname include:

 Marek Żukow-Karczewski (born 1961), Polish historian
 Stanisław Karczewski (born 1955), Polish politician
 Zdzisław Karczewski (1903-1970), Polish actor

Polish-language surnames